The Théâtre des Tuileries was a theatre in the former Tuileries Palace in Paris. It was also known as the Salle des Machines, because of its elaborate stage machinery, designed by the Italian theatre architects Gaspare Vigarani and his two sons, Carlo and Lodovico. Constructed in 1659–1661, it was originally intended for spectacular productions mounted by the court of the young Louis XIV, but in 1763 the theatre was greatly reduced in size and used in turn by the Paris Opera (up to 1770), the Comédie-Française (from 1770 to 1782), and the Théâtre de Monsieur (from January to December 1789). In 1808 Napoleon had a new theatre/ballroom built to the designs of the architects Percier and Fontaine. The Tuileries Palace and the theatre were destroyed by fire on 24 May 1871, during the Paris Commune.

Salle des Machines
The auditorium, designed and decorated by the architects Charles Errard, Louis Le Vau, and François d'Orbay, was housed in a pavilion located at the north end of the palace as originally built by the architect Philibert de l'Orme for Catherine de Médicis. Estimates of its seating capacity range from 6,000 to 8,000. The unusually deep stage was located in a gallery situated between the auditorium and a new, more northern pavilion, later designated as the Pavillon de Marsan.

The hall was inaugurated on 7 February 1662 with the premiere of Cavalli's Ercole amante. The costs of the project, including construction of the theatre, came to 120,000 livres, yet the opera was only performed eight times. The theatre was not used again until January 1671, when Psyché, a scenically spectacular play with music and ballet, was presented. This production cost 130,000 livres and was only performed twice. Psyché was reduced in size and successfully revived at the smaller Théâtre du Palais-Royal in July. The Salle des Machines was not used again for musical theatre during the remainder of Louis XIV's reign. In 1720, during the Regency of Louis XV, the hall was remodeled again, at a cost of nearly 150,000 livres, and it hosted the court ballet Les folies de Cardenio with music by Michel Richard Delalande. The young King Louis XV made his first and last appearance in a dancing role in this production. After Cardenio there were no further productions, except for some marionette shows in the 1730s. In view of the large expenditures on the theatre, it is surprising that it was so little used. Modern histories cite the poor acoustics, but Coeyman suggests that its disuse may have been the result of its large size: "the hall may have simply been too hard to fill."

Later incarnations
The theatre later underwent three substantial transformations: the first in 1763, when it was greatly reduced in size for the Paris Opera (to a capacity of 1,504 spectators) by the architects Jacques Soufflot and Jacques Gabriel; the second begun in November 1792 and competed before 10 May 1793, when  the National Convention moved from the Salle du Manege to the Salle des Machines; and the third in 1808, when Napoleon had a new theatre built to the designs of the architects Percier and Fontaine.

Notes

Bibliography
 Babeau, Albert (1895). Le Théâtre des Tuileries sous Louis XIV, Louis XV, et Louis XVI. Paris: Nogent-le-Rotrou, Daupeley-Gouverneur. Copy at Google Books. .
 Coeyman, Barbara (1998). "Opera and Ballet in Seventeenth-Century French Theatres: Case Studies of the Salle des Machines and the Palais Royal Theater" in Radice 1998, pp. 37–71.
 Donnet, Alexis (1821). Architectonographie des théâtres de Paris. Paris: P. Didot l'ainé. Copy at Google Books.
 Gaines, James F., editor (2002). The Molière Encyclopedia. Westport, Connecticut: Greenwood Press. .
 Lenôtre, Georges (1895). Paris révolutionnaire. Paris: Firmin-Didot. Copy at Google Books. .
 Radice, Mark A., editor (1998). Opera in Context: Essays on Historical Staging from the Late Renaissance to the Time of Puccini. Portland, Oregon: Amadeus Press. .
 Wild, Nicole (1989). Dictionnaire des théâtres parisiens au XIXe siècle: les théâtres et la musique. Paris: Aux Amateurs de livres. .  (paperback). View formats and editions at WorldCat.
 Wild, Nicole (2012). Dictionnaire des théâtres parisiens (1807–1914). Lyon: Symétrie. . .

Buildings and structures in the 1st arrondissement of Paris
Theatres completed in 1661
Tuileries
Opera houses in Paris
Music venues completed in 1661
1661 establishments in France